Phan Văn Hớn (1830–1886) also called Phan Công Hớn was a Vietnamese farmer who led a revolt against the French in Saigon in 1885. The rural revolt occurred in the Mười tám Thôn vườn trầu ("Eighteen Betel Nut Gardens" :vi:18 thôn vườn trầu) of Hóc Môn District's Bà Điểm commune.

References

1830 births
1886 deaths
Vietnamese activists